, is a series of tokusatsu fan film parodies produced by Daicon Films (now Gainax).  A parody of the 1977 Toei superhero show Kaiketsu Zubat (created by Shotaro Ishinomori), the title hero of this series has the same exact alter-ego, Ken Hayakawa, only he is a comically fat fanboyish young man wearing the same exact gringo cowboy attire.  As Noutenki, Ken Hayakawa is decked out in a pink & red jumpsuit (with a "no"/の on the chest), fixed navy blue galoshes, blue gloves, white hood and a yellow crash helmet.  He rides a fixed scooter.

Ken Hayakawa/Noutenki is played by Yasuhiro Takeda, who also produced this series, and went on to produce many of Daicon/Gainax's projects.

"Noutenki" is the Japanese word for "scatterbrain".

Bloopers/Outtakes (especially with the special effects sequences) are shown during the closing credits of each episode (and consequently, the credits sometimes deliberately went almost out of focus).

Films
Kaiketsu Noutenki (快傑のうてんき) August 1982, 15 minutes, video
Episode Title: "Watch Out, Young Woman - A Mistress' Fear" (危うし少女、メカケの恐怖 - Ayaushi Shǒjo, Mekake no Kyǒfu)
Kaiketsu Nōtenki 2 - Pure Love in Minato City (快傑の-てんき2 純愛港町篇 - Kaiketsu Nōtenki 2 - Junai Minato-cho Hen) March 1984, ? minutes, 8 mm
Kaiketsu Nōtenki in USA (快傑の-てんき in USA) June 1984, 4 minutes, video
Roleplaying Nōtenki in Seoul (ロールプレイングの-てんき in ソウル) August 1988, video

1980s Japanese films
Comedy film series
Fan films
Gainax
Tokusatsu films